A unisex name (also known as an epicene name, a gender-neutral name or an androgynous name) is a given name that is not gender-specific. Unisex names are common in the English-speaking world, especially in the United States. By contrast, some countries have laws preventing unisex names, requiring parents to give their children sex-specific names. In other countries or cultures, social norms oppose such names and transgressions may result in discrimination, ridicule, and psychological abuse.

Names may have different gender connotations from country to country or language to language. For example, the Italian male name Andrea (derived from Greek Andreas) is understood as a female name in many languages, such as English, German, Hungarian, Czech, and Spanish.

Parents may name their child in honor of a person of another sex, which – if done widely – can result in the name becoming unisex. For example, Christians, particularly Catholics, may give a child a second/middle name of the opposite sex, e.g. name a son Marie or Maria in honor of the Virgin Mary or formerly Anne for Saint Anne; or name a daughter José in honor of Saint Joseph or Jean in honor of John the Baptist. This practice is rare in English-speaking countries.

Some masculine and feminine names are homophones, pronounced the same for both sexes but spelled differently. These names are not strictly unisex names.

African

Unisex names of African origin include:

East Africa
 Alemayehu
 Berhane

South Africa
Kagiso
Karabo
Tshepiso (promise)
Lerato (love)
Puleng
Mogau/Magao
Lebogang
Mpho
Lesedi
Kabelo
Nonkululeko

Zimbabwe

Shona, a Bantu group in Zimbabwe, have unisex names which may indicate the circumstances of the baby or the family during the time of the birth. All Shona names have a meaning, some also celebrate virtue or worship God.

West Africa
 Abimbola
 Ade
 Anan
 Ayo
 Chidi
 Chike
 Dayo
 Efe
 Tolu
 Nana
 Imani
 Ekei
 Bassey
 Offiong
 Obo

Asian

Arabic

Armenian
Arshaluys (Արշալույս)
Artsvik (Արծվիկ)
Nairi / Nayiri (Նաիրի, Նայիրի)
Hayastan (Հայաստան)

Chinese

Chinese given names are composed of 1–3 Chinese characters, with the exception of non-Han ethnic groups who sometimes choose to use their native naming traditions instead and transliterate their names to Chinese for legal registration, often ending up in very long Chinese full names. Some characters have masculine connotations tied to them, some have feminine connotations, and some can be fully gender-neutral or will only gain a masculine/feminine leaning when paired with another character that has a specific leaning. Some Chinese given names may have the same pronunciation, but use different characters associated with different genders to give the name a gender association.

Hebrew

Many of the modern Hebrew names have become unisex, that suitable for both boys and girls. Some popular examples are:

Indian languages

Many Indian names become unisex when written with Latin characters because of the limitations of transliteration. The spellings Chandra and Krishna, for example, are transliterations of both the masculine and feminine versions of those names. In Indian languages, the final a in each of these names are different letters with different pronunciations, so there is no ambiguity. However, when they are seen (and usually, spoken) by someone unfamiliar with Indian languages, they become sexually ambiguous. Other Indian names, such as Ananda, are exclusively or nearly exclusively masculine in India, but because of their a ending, are assumed to be feminine in Anglophone societies.

Nehal, Sonal, Sonu, Snehal, Niral, Pranjal and Anmol are used commonly to name baby boys or girls in western states of India such as Gujarat. Similarly, names like Kajal, Sujal, Viral, Harshal, Deepal, Bobby, Mrinal, Jyoti, Shakti, Nilam, Kiran, Lucky, Ashwini, Shashi, Malhar, Umang, Shubham and Anupam are also very common sex-neutral names or unisex names in India. Most Punjabi Sikh first names such as "Sandeep, Gurdeep, Kuldeep, Mandeep", "Surjeet, Gurjeet, Kuljeet, Harjeet, Manjeet", "Harpreet, Gurpreet, Jaspreet, Kulpreet, Manpreet", "Prabhjot, Harjot, Gurjot, Jasjot" and "Sukhjinder, Bhupinder, Jasbinder, Parminder, Kulvinder, Harjinder, Ranjodh, Sheeraz, Hardeep, Kirandeep, Sukhdeep, Govindpal, Encarl, Rajan" are unisex names and equally commonly given to either sex. Also, names derived from Dari Persian and Arabic, but not used among native speakers of those languages, are common among South Asian Muslims. Since Persian does not assign genders to inanimate nouns, some of these names are gender-neutral, for example Roshan, Hitesh, Sudesh, Parveen, and Insaaf.

Indonesian

 Dian: lamp
 Eka: first born
 Nana

Japanese

Despite there being only a small number of Japanese unisex names in use, unisex names are widely popular. Many high-profile Japanese celebrities such as Hikaru Utada, Jun Matsumoto, Ryo Nishikido, and Izumi Sakai have unisex names.

Many of the entries in the following list, in Roman characters, each represent more than one name, with different meanings, which are often distinguished by the use of different kanji characters.

Nicknames
Unisex names may also be used as nicknames. For example, a man named Ryounosuke and a woman named Ryouko may both use the unisex name Ryou as a nickname.

Korean
All Korean names are unisex (ungendered), but some names are more commonly given to boys and other more commonly to girls.

Persian
 Arya
 Azar
 Dana
 Nikan
 Nima
 Tiam
 Yara

Turkish

There are many Turkish names which are unisex. These names are almost always pure Turkish names (i.e. not Turkified Arabic names that have an Islamic connotation) that derive from Turkish words. These names may either be modern names or be derived from Turkic mythology. Some Persian-derived Turkish names, like Can and Cihan, are also unisex, as are even a few Arabic-derived names, like İhsan and Nur.

Among the common examples of the many unisex names in Turkey are:

Vietnamese

Among modern Vietnamese names, unisex names are very popular. Vietnamese people may distinguish unisex names by middle names. For example Quốc Khánh may be a male name (Quốc is a male name) and Ngân Khánh may be a female name (Ngân is a female name), and sex-specific middle names such as Văn for males and Thị for females also help. In many cases, a male could have a female name and vice versa. Popular examples of unisex names in Vietnamese are:

 Anh (beautiful, outstanding, hero)
 An (safe and sound)
 Châu (pearl)
 Dương (light, sun)
 Giang (big river)
 Hà (river)
 Hải (sea)
 Khánh (joyful celebration, bell)
 Linh (divinity, essence, spirit, soul)
 Nhân (kindness, humanity)
 Thanh (clear, pure, distinct, youth, young, cyan)
 Tú (elegant, talented person)
 Tường (wise, luck)

European

Basque
Euskaltzaindia, the official academic language regulatory institution which watches over the Basque language, has a list of unisex names. Some of them are:
Amaiur
 Amets
 Aran
Bidatz
Ekai
Eraitz
Ibiur
Joar
Sahats
Udabe

Serbo-Croatian 

 Matija (generally male, but female in the Neretva region)
 Saša (a nickname of Aleksandar/Aleksandra)
 Vanja
 Minja
 Borna

Czech 
The Czech Registry Act forbids giving male names or surnames to females or female names or surnames to males, but does not restrict neutral names and surnames. For the period of transitioning, the Act explicitly allows the use of gender-neutral given names and surnames.

A Czech trans people web enumerates given names which are most popular as gender-neutral names. Most of them are originally hypocorisms, or loanwords. The most natural of them are names ending with -a, falling under male inflectional paradigm "předseda" and/or female paradigm "žena". Generally, hypocorisms are not allowed to be used in official registers, but in case of trans people, they are tolerated.

The most popular neutral names are Saša and Nikola, both with a slight Russian (or East-Slavic) connotation. Other names of that paradigm are Áda, Jarka, Jára, Jindra, Jirča, Jirka, Kája, Mára, Míla, Mira, Míša, Míťa, Nikola, Péťa, Saša, Stáňa, Sváťa, Štěpa, Vlasta, Zbyňa, Zdena. They are unisex hypocorisms of complementary male and female names, e.g. Péťa belong to male "Petr" as well as female "Petra". Ilja, Issa, Bronia or Andrea are felt as original foreign names. Maria is felt as a female name (this form is reserved for mother of Jesus, the common Czech female form is Marie, the male form is Marián), but some historical men are known under that name (Klement Maria Hofbauer, Jan Maria Vianney, Rainer Maria Rilke).

Other mentioned names are mostly considered to be foreign names:
 Alex, Aliz, Janis, Jannis
 Dan, Jean, Kim, Robin, Vivian
 Andy, Deny, Lenny, Romy, Viky, Marti, Riki, Niki, Robbie
 Ivo
 René
 Martine, Michele.
 Nikol

The page indicates some other names which can be usable as unisex but are not tried by that community yet.

Dutch 
This is a list of the 20 most common names of which at least 10% are of the other sex. 
The most popular names are at the top.

 Anne (to be exact: a boy's name in the West Frisian language, a girl's name in Dutch)
 Robin
 Willy
 Sam
 Nicky
 Marijn
 Dominique
 Luca
 Bo
 Jentje
 Jos
 Senna
 Jamie
 Ali
 Indy
 Dani
 Henny
 Ruth
 Eliza
 Jaimy

Finnish

Finnish law forbids giving a female name to a male child and a male name to a female child among other restrictions. Some names do exist that have been given to children of both genders. Such unisex names were more common in the first half of the 20th century. This is an incomplete list:

Many of these names are rare, foreign or neologisms; established names tend to be strongly sex-specific. Notably, a class of names that are derived from nature can be often used for either sex, for example: Aalto (wave), Halla (frost), Lumi (snow), Paju (willow), Ruska (fall colors), and Valo (light). Similarly, there are some (sometimes archaic) adjectives which carry no strong gender connotations, like Kaino (timid), Vieno (calm) or Lahja (a gift). Certain names can have unisex diminutives, such as Alex, which can be short for Aleksandra or Aleksanteri (or variants thereof).

French

Popular unisex names of French origin include:

There are also pairs of masculine and feminine names that have slightly different spellings but identical pronunciation, such as André / Andrée, Frédéric / Frédérique, René / Renée and Gabriel / Gabrielle. In France and French-speaking countries, it can happen for people to have a combination of both masculine and feminine given names, but most of these include "Marie", such as Jean-Marie, Marie-Jean, Marie-Pierre. Marie was a unisex name in medieval times; it is nowadays only female except for its presence in compound names. Notable examples of people with a combination of masculine and feminine given names are Jean-Marie Le Pen (male), Marie-Jean Hérault de Séchelles (male), Marie-Pierre Kœnig (male), and Marie-Pierre Leray (female). In the past, it was not unusual to give a child that was assigned male at birth the middle name Marie as a sign of religious devotion; the most notable example is that of François Maurice Marie Mitterrand.

European royals often bear the name Marie, the French form of Maria, in their names. Prince Amedeo of Belgium, Archduke of Austria-Este (Amedeo Marie Joseph Carl Pierre Philippe Paola Marcus), Prince Jean of Luxembourg (Jean Félix Marie Guillaume), and Jean, Grand Duke of Luxembourg (Jean Benoît Guillaume Robert Antoine Louis Marie Adolphe Marc) are examples of male royals who bear Marie in their names.

German

In the past, German law required parents to give their child a sex-specific name. This is no longer the case, since the Federal Constitutional Court of Germany held in 2008 that there is no obligation for a name to be sex-specific, even if the child has only one given name. The custom of adding a second name which matches the child's legal sex is no longer required. Still, unisex names of German origin are rare, most of them being nicknames rather than formal names (such as Alex).

Examples of unisex names include:

 Eike
 Gustl (the male variant is a shortening of August or Gustav, the female for Augusta)
 Kai
 Kim
 Lennox
 Luca
 Micha
 Michi
 Mika
 Niko
 Sascha 
 Sigi
 Toni
 Ulli 
 Willy

Greek

 Bronte
 Cyril
 Dorian
 Eris
 Haris
 Kyrie
 Nyx
 Orion
 Paris (given name)

Icelandic

In June, 2019, Iceland's Parliament, the Althing, passed a new gender autonomy act which will recognize all approved Icelandic names as unisex.

Previously, unisex names were in generally illegal in Iceland. The Icelandic Naming Committee (Icelandic: Mannanafnanefnd) maintained preapproved lists of male and female names, with names not on the list - or on a different gender's list - typically denied. Earlier court cases had carved out exceptions, such as the names Blær (approved for women after a 2013 court case), Auður (approved for men later in 2013), and Alex (denied for women in 2013 but approved in 2018).

Additionally, the new gender autonomy act makes changes to the traditional patronymics/matronymics used as Icelandic surnames. Before the bill, Icelandic last names (by law) could not be unisex: the suffix -dóttir ("daughter") was attached to a parent's name for women and the suffix -son ("son") was used for men. The new law will allow adults who have officially changed their gender marker to "X", a non-binary gender marker, to also change their patronymic/matronymic suffix to -bur ("child"). Newborns cannot be assigned a non-binary gender marker at this time, and will continue to receive a patronymic/matronymic suffix in keeping with their assigned sex at birth.

Irish

 Ailbhe
 Aran
 Brogan
 Carey
 Carling
 Casey
 Finley
 Flann
 Flannery
 Kerry
 Naoise 
 Nollaig
 Riley/Reilly
 Ryan
 Shannon
 Shea
 Sláine
 Teagan
 Tierney

Among Irish Catholics in the 19th and 20th centuries, it was not unusual to give a child that was assigned male at birth a feminine middle name, particularly "Mary", as a sign of religious devotion. Joseph Mary Plunkett was a signatory of the Irish Declaration of Independence in 1916, and was later executed as one of the leaders of the Easter Rising.

Italian

In Italy, unisex names (nomi ambigenere) are very rare. There are names that are primarily male, like Andrea (which is female, e.g., in English, Spanish, German, and French) or Felice, that can also be given to females. Names like Celeste, Amabile, Fiore, Loreto, or Diamante are, as opposite, female names that occasionally can be given to males.

Sometimes "Maria" is used as a middle male name (such as Antonio Maria).

"Rosario" (feminine: "Rosaria") is a male name in Italian whereas in Spanish it is female.

There are also unisex nicknames, for example:

 Giusi or Giusy can stand either for Giuseppe ("Joseph") or Giuseppina ("Josephine").
 Dani or Dany can stand for Daniele (male) or Daniela (female).
 Ale can stand for Alessandro (male) or Alessandra (female).
 Fede can stand either for Federico or Federica.

Portuguese

 Carmo
 Cruz
Duda

Brazilian
Names that end with an i are considered unisex in Brazil. They tend to be Native Brazilian Indigenous names in origin, such as Araci, Jaci, Darci, Ubirani, but names from other cultures are now being absorbed, such as Remy, Wendy, and Eddy. Names that end with ir and mar tend to be unisex also, such as Nadir, Aldenir, Dagmar and Niomar – though in these cases there are some exceptions.

Russian

Diminutive forms of names in Russian language can be unisex, such as Sasha/Shura (Alexandr or Alexandra), Zhenya (Yevgeniy or Yevgeniya), Valya (Valentin or Valentina), Valera (Valeriy or Valeriya), Slava (for names ending with -slav or -slava), Vitalya (Vitaly or Vitalia).

Slovene
 Fran (diminutive of Frančiška)
 Ivica (diminutive of Ivan (John) or Ivana (Joanne))
 Saša (diminutive of Aleksander (Alexander))
 Slava (diminutive of Slavko)
 Vanja (diminutive of Ivan or Ivana)

Spanish

In Spain, unisex names are extremely rare. María, an originally feminine name is used in Spanish for males as second name, very commonly after José (e.g., José María). José is used for females preceded by María (María José). Also, Guadalupe, a feminine name, is sometimes used as masculine after José (José Guadalupe). More names given to both genders include Carmen, Inés, Reno, Trinidad, Nazaret, Reyes, and Celes.

Like in English, some common nicknames are unisex such as Álex (Alejandro, Alejandra), Cris (Cristina, Cristian, Cristóbal), and Dani (Daniel, Daniela).

Swedish
Swedish unisex names do generally follow the tradition as in similar Western countries, including names such as Robin, Kim, Lou and Lee. Unisex names that are particularly Swedish include Mio, after the popular Astrid Lindgren book Mio, my son, and  Tintin, after the popularity of the Belgian comics character.

English speaking world

Unisex names have been enjoying some popularity in English-speaking countries in the past several decades. Masculine names have become increasingly popular among females in the past century, but originally feminine names remain extremely rare among males. 

Unisex names include:

In the United States, most of the above-mentioned male names are now largely female, while in Britain, some (notably Charlie, Hilary, Sidney, and Robin) remain largely male. Sometimes different spellings have different sex distributions (Francis is less likely female than Frances), but these are rarely definitive. For example, in the US, as of 2016, both Skylar and Skyler are more common for females, but Skylar is most strongly associated with females (the 42nd most common name for females and the 761 most common for males born in 2016) than Skyler (the 359 most common name for females and the 414 most common for males born in 2016).

Origin 
Modern unisex names may derive from:
 Nature (Lake, Rain/Raine, Sky/Skye, Willow, Terra, River, Ocean, Juniper, Ash, Darnel, Aspen, Linden, Winter, Cloud, Snow, Cedar, Sequoia, Lightning, Sorrel, Aderyn, Barkley)
 Colors (Blue, Gray/Grey, Indigo, Emerald, Cyan, Navy, Crimson, Onyx, Azure, Teal, Alba, Umber, Garnet, Jade)
 Places (Dakota, India, Indiana, Montana, London, Brooklyn, Ireland, Rio, Egypt, Windsor, Texas, Sydney)
 Metals (Silver, Gold/Goldie, Bronze, Platinum)
 Surnames (Parker, Mackenzie, Madison, Kennedy, Oakley, McKenna, Ashton, Lincoln, Maxwell, Easton, Daley/Daly, Marin, Keegan, Aniston, Shaw, Sinclair, Adair, Monet)
 Animals (Fox, Fennec, Robin, Phoenix, Wren, Raven, Sparrow, Leo, Roan, Dove, Lark)
 Months (January, March, April, May, June, August, September, October)
 Directions (North, West)
 Food (Apple, Kale, Saffron, Clove)
 Pop culture:
 Books (Esme, Logan, Pepper, Rey, Rogue)
 Film and television (Harley Quinn, Ivy, Onix)
 Video games (Luca, Marluxia, Riku/Rikku, Ryu, Sora, Wynne)
 Words (Haven, Justice, Journey, Gentry, Honor, Sunny, Happy, Heaven, Rebel, Wisdom, Lyric)
 Astronomy and mythology (Altair, Leo, Orion, Juno)
 Jewels (Diamond, Jade, Emerald, Pearl)

Examples of unisex names among celebrities and their children are:

 Ashton (Ashton Kutcher and Ashton Shepherd)
 Brooklyn (Brooklyn Beckham and Brooklyn Decker)
 Bryce (Bryce Papenbrook and Bryce Dallas Howard)
 Cameron (Cameron Crowe and Cameron Diaz)
 Devon (Devon Bostick and Devon Aoki)
 Drew (Drew Seeley and Drew Barrymore)
 Dylan (Dylan Walsh and Dylan Penn)
 Evan (Evan Peters and Evan Rachel Wood)
 Genesis (Genesis Servania and Genesis Rodriguez)
 Hayden (Hayden Christensen and Hayden Panettiere)
 Jamie (Jamie Bell and Jamie Lee Curtis)
 Jordan (Jordan Knight and Jordan Pruitt)
 Kirby (Kirby Morrow and Kirby Bliss Blanton)
 Leighton (Leighton Baines and Leighton Meester)

 Mel (Mel Gibson and Mel B)
 Michael (Michael Keaton and Michael Learned)
 Morgan (Morgan Freeman and Morgan Fairchild)
 Noah (Noah Hathaway and Noah Lindsey Cyrus)
 Peyton (Peyton Manning and Peyton List)
 Rebel (Rebel Rodriguez and Rebel Wilson)
 Remy (Remy Hii and Remy Ryan)
 Ryan (Ryan Reynolds and Ryan Simpkins)
 Robin (Robin Williams and Robin Wright)
 Rowan (Rowan Atkinson and Rowan Blanchard)
 Sidney (Sidney Crosby and Sydney Leroux)
 Spencer (Spencer Tracy and Spencer Grammer)
 Taylor (Taylor Lautner and Taylor Swift)
 Tracy (Tracy Morgan and Tracy Chapman)

According to the Social Security Administration, Jayden has been the most popular unisex name for boys since 2008 and Madison has been the most popular unisex name for girls since 2000 in the United States.
Prior to Jayden, Logan was the most popular unisex name for boys and prior to Madison, Alexis was the most popular unisex name for girls.

Nicknames 
Many popular nicknames are unisex. Some nicknames, such as Alex and Pat, have become popular as given names in their own right.
The following list of unisex nicknames are most commonly seen in English-speaking countries such as Canada, the United States, Australia, New Zealand, South Africa, and the United Kingdom.

 Addie, Adi, Addi, Addy – Adam, Adelaide, Adele, Adrian, Adrien, Addison
 Adri – Adrian, Adriana, Adrienne
 Alec, Aleck, Alex, Alexi – Alexander, Alexandra, Alexis, Alexandria, Alexa, Alexius, Alexia
 Al, Ali, Allie, Aly – Albert, Alberta, Alexander, Alexandra, Alexandria, Alexis, Alexa, Alexius, Alexia, Alfred, Alice, Alison, Almira, Alistair, Alister, Alpha, Alyssa
 Andi, Andie, Andy – Andrea, Andre, Andrew
 Angie – Angelo, Angela, Angelina, Angelica, Angel, Angus
 Annie – Anna, Anne, Annette, Andrea, Angela, Andre, Andrew, Angelo, Angelina, Angelica, Angus
 Ari – Aria, Ariana, Ariane, Arianna, Ariano, Ariel, Ariela, Ariella
 Arlie – Arleen, Arlene, Arline, Arlington
 Ash, Ashe – Ashelia, Asher, Ashford, Ashley, Ashlyn, Ashton
 Audry – Audric, Audria, Audrea, Audrey
 Avie – Ava, Avanel, Avery, Avis
 Bennie, Benny, Bernie, Berny – Benedict, Bennett, Benjamin, Bernadette, Bernard, Bernice, Ebenezer
 Bert, Berti, Bertie, Berty – Albert, Alberta, Hubert, Gilbert, Herbert, Alberto, Wilbert, Robert, Roberta, Roberto
 Bill, Billie, Billy – Belinda, William, Willard, Wilma, Wilhelmina, Willow
 Bo –  Beaufort, Beauregard, Bonita, Bonnie, Robert
 Bob, Bobbi, Bobbie, Bobby – Robert, Roberta, Roberto
 Cade, Caed, Kade – Caden, Cadence
 Cam, Cammie, Cammy, Kam, Kammy – Cameron, Camilla, Camille
 Car, Kar – Carmen, Carolina, Caroline, Carsen, Carson, Cary, Caryss, Karolina, Karoline, Kary, Karyss
 Cass, Cassi, Cassie, Cassy – Caspar, Casper, Cassandra, Cassian, Cassidy, Cassius
 Charli, Charlie, Charley – Charlene, Charles, Charlotte, Charlize
 Chris, Chrissy, Christi, Christie, Christy – Christian, Christina, Christianna, Christianne, Christine, Christoph, Christophe, Christopher
 Cid, Cyd, Sid, Syd – Cidney, Cydney, Sidney, Sidra, Sydelle, Sydney, Sydra
 Clem – Clement, Clementine, Clementina, Clemency
 Cleo – Cleon, Cleopatra
 Cobie, Coby, Koby – Cobalt, Coburn, Jacob, Jacoba
 Connie – Conner, Conrad, Constance, Cornelia, Cornelius, Cornell
 Cor, Corie, Corrie, Corry, Cory, Kori, Korie, Kory – Cornelia, Cornelius, Coriander, Corin, Corina, Corrina, Corwin, Koriander, Korina, Korrina, Korwin
 Dale – Daley, Daly
 Dan, Dani, Danni, Dannie, Danny – Daniel, Danielle, Daniela
 Dash – Dashiell, Dasha
 D, Dee – David, Deanna, Deanne, Dee Dee
 Del, Dell – Delano, Delbert, Delita, Della, Delta, Delvon, Derek, Odell
 Dom – Domenic, Domenica, Dominic, Dominica, Dominique
 Don, Donnie, Donny – Donald, Donatella, Donatello, Donna
 Dusty – Dustin
 Ed, Edd, Eddi, Eddie, Eddy – Edgar, Edmund, Edward, Edwin, Edwina
 El, Ell, Ellie – Elle, Ellia, Elliot, Ellis
 Em – Emery, Emil, Emma, Emmett, Emmie, Emmy
 Ev, Evie – Eva, Evan, Evanne, Eve, Evelyn, Everett
 Fran – Frances, Francis, Francesca, Francesco, Francisco, Francisca, Francine
 Frank, Franki, Frankie, Franky – Frances, Francis, Francesca, Francesco, Francine, Franklin
 Franni, Frannie, Franny – Frances, Francis, Francesca, Francesco, Francine
 Fred, Freddi, Freddie, Freddy – Freda, Frederick, Frederica, Alfred, Manfred, Freida
 Gab, Gabbi, Gabbie, Gabby, Gabi – Gabriel, Gabriella, Gabrielle
 Gay – Gabriel, Gaylen, Gaylene, Gaylord, Gaynell, Gaynor
 Gem, Jem – Gema, Gemara, Gemarah, Gemma, James, Jeremiah, Jemma, Jemima, Jemina, Jeremy
 Gene – Eugene, Eugenia, Eugenie, Geena
 Georgie – George, Georges, Georgiana, Georgette, Georgia, Georgina
 Geri, Gerrie, Gerry, Jeri, Jerry – Gerald, Geraldine, Gerard, Jeremiah, Jeremy, Jerome
 Gert –  Gerta, Gerti, Gertie, Gertrud, Gertruda, Gertrude, Gerty
 Gill – Gilbert, Gillian, Gilly
 Hal – Hala, Halbert, Hallie, Harold
 Harry, Harri – Harold, Harrison, Harriet
 Hay – Hannah, Hayden, Hayley
 Hennie – Hendrik, Hendrika, Hendrikus
 Iggie, Iggy – Ignacio, Ignatius
 Indy – Indiana, Indigo
 Issy, Iz, Izzi, Izzie, Izzy – Isaac, Isabel, Isabella, Isabelle, Isadora, Isidore, Isolde, Elizabeth
 Jacki, Jackie, Jacky – Jack, Jackson, Jacqueline, John
 Jan – Janet, Janice, Janis, John
 Jazz – Jasmin, Jasmine, Jasper
 Jay – Jacob, James, Jamie, Jason, Jade, Jayde, Jane, Jayden
 Jer – Jeremy, Jeremiah, Jerome, Jerry
 Jess – Jessabelle, Jessalyn, Jessamyn, Jesse, Jessi, Jessica, Jessie
Jo, Joey, Jojo – Joan, Joanna, Joanne, Joby, Joely, Johannes, Joseph, José, Josephine, Josephina, Josepha
Josey, Josie – Joseph, Josephine, Josephina, Josepha
 Joss – Jocelyn, Joseph, Jose, Josiah
 Jools, Jules – Julia, Julian, Juliana, Julianne, Julie, Julius

 Kel – Kelly, Kelsey
 Ken – Kenneth, Kendall, Kennedy, Kendrick, Kendra, Mackenzie
 Kenzie – Mackenzie
 Kit – Christopher, Katherine, Kathleen
 Kris – Krista, Kristen, Kristian, Kristina, Kristin, Kristine, Kristoff, Kristopher
 Laurie, Lorrie – Laurence, Lawrence, Lawrencine, Loretta, Lorraine
 Len, Lenne, Lennie, Lenny – Lennox, Leonard, Leonardo
 Leo – Leon, Leona, Leonard, Leonora, Leopold
 Les – Leslie, Lesley, Lester
 Lex – Alexander, Alexandra, Alexis, Alexandria, Alexa, Alexius, Alexia, Lexington
 Lin, Lyn, Lynn – Linda, Lindsay, Lindy, Lyndon, Marilyn
Lyss - Melissa
 Liv – Livia, Olive, Oliver, Olivia
 Loren – Lorenzo
 Lou, Louie – Lewis, Louis, Louisa, Louise, Lucas, Lucy, Lucilla, Lucille, Lucinda
 Louie – Louis, Louise
 Mac, Mack – Mackenzie, Mackey
 Maddi, Maddie, Maddy – Madeleine, Madeline, Madison, Maddox, Madox
 Mal – Malachi, Malcolm, Mallory
 Manda – Amanda, Miranda
 Mandi, Mandie, Mandy – Amanda, Amandus, Armand, Mandel
 Marl – Marlee, Marlene, Marley, Marlon
 Marti, Martie, Marty – Martin, Martina, Martha
 Matt, Matti, Mattie, Matty – Mathilda, Matilda, Matthew, Martha
 Max, Maxie – Maximilian, Maximus, Maxine, Maxwell
 Mel – Melanie, Melinda, Melissa, Melody, Melrose, Melvin, Melina
 Mic, Micki, Mickie, Mickey, Micky- Michael, Michaela, Michelle
 Mitchie – Michelle, Mitchel, Mitchell
 Mo, Moe – Maureen, Maurice, Mohamed, Morris
 Mont, Monti, Montie, Monty – Monta, Montae, Montague, Montana, Montgomery
 Nat, Natty – Nathanael, Natalia, Nathalie, Natasha, Nathan, Nathaniel, Natalie
 Nick, Nicki, Nicky, Nik, Nikki – Nicholas, Nicola, Nicole, Nicolette, Nikita, Nico
 Norrie – Nora, Norah, Norman, Norris
 Oli, Olie, Olli, Ollie, Olly – Olive, Oliver, Olivia
 Pat, Patsy, Patti, Pattie, Patty – Patricia, Patrick, Patrice
 Pay, Pey – Payton, Peyton
 Pip – Philip, Philippa, Pipkin, Pippa, Pippin
 Rae, Raine, Ray, Rey – Lorraine, Rachel, Ramona, Raymond, Reymond, Raven, Raphael, Racquel, Raquel
 Raf, Raffi, Raffy, Raph – Rafael, Raffaela, Raffaella, Raffaello, Raphael
 Randy – Andrew, Bertrand, Miranda, Randall, Randolf, Randolph, Veronica
 Reggie – Regina, Reginald
 Remy – Remington
 Ren, Rennie – Irene, Rene, Renée, Rennard, Serenity, Warren
 Rob, Robi, Robbie, Robby – Robert, Roberta, Roberto, Robin, Robyn
 Romi, Romy – Roman, Romeo, Rosemary, Rosemarie
 Ron, Roni, Ronni, Ronnie, Ronny – Ronald, Ronalda, Ronette, Veronica
 Roz – Rosa, Rosalie, Rosalind, Rosalyn, Roswell
 Ruby – Reuben, Ruben, Rubin, Rubina
 Russi, Russy – Russell
 Sacha, Sascha, Sasha – Alexander, Alexandra
 Sal – Sally, Salvador, Sarah 
 Sam, Sammi, Sammie, Sammy – Samson, Samuel, Samantha, Samara, Samira, Samsara
 Sandi, Sandie, Sandy – Alexander, Alexandra, Lysander, Sandra, Cassandra
 Shelley, Shelli, Shellie, Shelly – Michelle, Sheldon, Shelton
 Shirl – Shirley
 Stace – Eustace, Stacey, Staci, Stacy
 Stef, Steff, Steph, Steve, Stevie – Stefan, Stephan, Stefanie, Stephanie, Stephen, Steven
 Sy – Simon, Seymour, Sylvester
 Tay – Tayshaun, Taylor
 Tee – Teagan, Teal, Teala, Teale, Teegan, Teela, Teelah, Teena
 Teddy – Edward, Thaddeus, Theodora, Theodore
 Terri, Terry – Terence, Teresa, Theresa
 Teo, Theo – Theobald, Theodora, Theodore, Theodoros
 Tibby – Tabitha, Theobald
 Tobey, Toby – Tobias
 Toni, Tonie, Tony – Anthony, Antonio, Antonia, Antoinette
 Tor, Tori, Torrey, Torry, Tory – Torrance, Torrence, Victor, Victoria
 Ty – Taryn, Tyler, Tyrone, Tyson
 Val – Valentina, Valentine, Valentino, Valerie
 Vern – Lavern, Laverne, Vernon
 Vic, Vickie, Vicki, Vicky  – Victor, Victoria
 Viv, Vivi – Vivian, Viviana, Vivien, Vivienne
 Whit – Whitney, Whitfield, Whitman, Whittier
 Wil, Will – Wilkie, Wilhelm, Wilhelmina, William, Willa, Willow, Wilma
 Xan –  Alexander, Alexandra, Alexandria, Xander, Xanthe
 Zan – Suzanna, Suzanne, Zander
 Zell – Zelda, Zella, Zelle, Zelly, Zelma

Cross-cultural
Some names are masculine in one culture and feminine in another, so that when these cultures mix in a third location, the same name appears unisex.

See also
 Epicene
 Unisex
 Gender equality

References

External links
 1990 Census Name Files
 Behind the Name
 Names.org

 
Gender in language
Sociolinguistics